Myriam Mizouni (born 23 September 1958) is a Tunisian former swimmer. She competed in two events at the 1976 Summer Olympics. She was the first woman to represent Tunisia at the Olympics. In 1974, she competed in international competition in a duo with Ali Gharbi. She was elected second best African sportswoman of the year in 1975. From 1 July 2011 to 24 December 2011, she served as Secretary of State in the Tunisian Ministry of Youth and Sports. She is married with two children.

References

External links
 

1958 births
Living people
Tunisian female swimmers
Olympic swimmers of Tunisia
Swimmers at the 1976 Summer Olympics
Place of birth missing (living people)
Mediterranean Games silver medalists for Tunisia
Mediterranean Games medalists in swimming
Swimmers at the 1975 Mediterranean Games
People from Aryanah
Women government ministers of Tunisia
Government ministers of Tunisia
20th-century Tunisian women
21st-century Tunisian women
African Games medalists in swimming
Competitors at the 1978 All-Africa Games
African Games gold medalists for Tunisia
African Games bronze medalists for Tunisia